The Institute for Advanced Architecture of Catalonia also known as IAAC, is an educational and research centre dedicated to the development of an architecture capable of meeting the worldwide challenges in the construction of habitability in the early 21st century.

Based in the 22@ district of Barcelona, one of the world’s capitals of architecture and urbanism, IAAC is a platform for the exchange of knowledge with faculty and students from over 40 countries,
including United States, China, India, Poland, Italy, Norway, Mexico and Sudan. Students work simultaneously on multiple scales (city, building, manufacturing) and in different areas of expertise (ecology, energy, digital manufacturing, new technologies), pursuing their own lines of enquiry on the way to developing an integrated set of skills with which to act effectively in their home country or globally.

IAAC has carried out research projects in Brazil, Taiwan, Croatia and Romania. In 2008 it was chosen to take part in the official section of the Venice Biennale with the project Hyperhabitat and in 2010 it presented a 1:1 scale house at the Solar Decathlon Europe in Madrid where it won the Peoples Choice Award has the most advanced digital production laboratory of any educational institution in southern Europe, with laser cutters, 3D printers, milling machines and a platform for manufacturing chips. IAAC also designed the first 3D printed bridge in the world in collaboration with Acciona, which was built in Alcobendas (Spain) in 2016.

IAAC offers a wide range of educational programmes in the field of advanced architecture, ecological buildings, city and technology, robotics and advanced construction, and design for emergent futures which are accredited by the UPC Polytechnic University. The Institute is an open, independent and radical non-profit foundation inspired by the values of Barcelona, the capital of architecture and design, where urbanism was invented and where a local high quality and innovation-oriented research is connected to an international network of excellence in technology, architecture and society fields.

IAAC, beyond its educational and pro-research work, is an interdisciplinary and multicultural stable community that seeks permanent contact and cooperation among the hundreds of teachers, researchers, institutions and companies that have worked with us or that pursue the objective of providing solutions to the great challenges of humanity. The Institute is an innovation hub that includes in its organization the research centre for self-sufficiency Valldaura Labs and the digital fabrication laboratory Fab Lab Barcelona, which is part of the global network of Fab Labs affiliated to MIT’s Center for Bit and Atoms.

Vision
Located in Barcelona, one of the international capitals of Urbanism, the institution develops a multidisciplinary programme that explores urban and international territorial phenomena, placing especial emphasis on the opportunities that emerges from developing countries and the cultural, economic and social values that architecture may contribute to society.

Objectives
The main objective of the Institute for Advanced Architecture of Catalonia is to stimulate, promote and develop research on the diverse areas of advanced architecture promoting the development of knowledge in architecture and its interaction with other disciplines.

Curriculum
Some of the most important projects and publications done by the Institute recently are Hipercatalunya (a research about the territory of Catalonia) The Media House (a project developed with the MIT's Media Lab) and the Metapolis Dictionary of Advanced Architecture.

External links 

 Institute for Advanced Architecture of Catalonia (IAAC)
 Fab Lab Barcelona
Valldaura Labs
 Fab Lab House

Technical universities and colleges
Universities in Catalonia
Education in Barcelona
Catalan architecture
International schools in Spain